The 1940 Tulane Green Wave football team represented Tulane University as a member of the Southeastern Conference (SEC) during the 1940 college football season. Led by fifth-year head coach Red Dawson, the Green Wave played their home games at Tulane Stadium in New Orleans. Tulane finished the season with an overall record of 5–5 and a mark of 1–3 in conference play, placing tenth in the SEC.

Schedule

References

Tulane
Tulane Green Wave football seasons
Tulane Green Wave football